Bolzano Novarese (Piedmontese: Bolsan, Lombard: Bulzan) is a comune (municipality) in the Province of Novara in the Italian region of Piedmont, located about  northeast of Turin and about  northwest of Novara.

Bolzano Novarese borders the following municipalities: Ameno, Gozzano, Invorio, and Orta San Giulio.

People 
 The Italian ski mountaineer Carlo Battel was born in Bolzano on May 6, 1972.

References

External links
 Official website

Cities and towns in Piedmont